Les Stentors are a 4-member vocal super group made up of operatic voices from all regions of France. 

Their self-titled debut album, Les Stentors, was released in 2010. Their second album Voyage en France, released on 14 May 2012, was an immediate success, shooting straight to #1 on the SNEP, the Official French Albums Chart, in its first week of release.

Members
Vyanney Guyonnet - baritone
Mowgli Laps - tenor
Sébastien Lemoine - bass
Mathieu Sempere - tenor

Discography

Albums

Singles

References

External links
Official website

French musical groups
Musical groups established in 2010
Opera crossover singers
Musical quartets
2010 establishments in France